John Joseph Horgan  (born August 7, 1959) is a Canadian politician who served as the 36th premier of British Columbia from 2017 to 2022, and also as the leader of the British Columbia New Democratic Party from 2014 to 2022. Horgan has been the member of the Legislative Assembly (MLA) for the constituency of Langford-Juan de Fuca and its predecessors since 2005.

Horgan was born and raised in Victoria, British Columbia. In June 2006, he was appointed the Official Opposition critic for the Ministry of Energy and Mines in New Democrat leader Carole James' shadow cabinet, having previously served as the Official Opposition critic for the Ministry of Education. In January 2011, he announced his candidacy for leadership of the BC NDP in the 2011 leadership election, finishing third.

Following the leadership election, he was appointed the Official Opposition critic for Energy, and Opposition house leader. He was replaced by Bruce Ralston as Opposition house leader following his entry into the 2014 leadership election.

On March 17, 2014, he announced his candidacy in the 2014 leadership election, with the slogan "Real Leadership. For All BC". During the campaign he talked at length about the necessity of balancing the need for jobs and resource development, while protecting BC's natural environment. Horgan was acclaimed to the position on May 1, 2014, and was officially inaugurated as party leader on May 5, 2014.

In the 2017 provincial election held on May 9, 2017, Premier Christy Clark's BC Liberal government was reduced to 43 seats, one seat short of a majority. On May 29, 2017, it was announced that the NDP and Green Party of British Columbia had reached a confidence and supply agreement in which the Greens would support an NDP minority government for four years. After the legislature was recalled, Clark sought its confidence in the Liberal government. Following a non-confidence motion on June 29, 2017, which was won (44–42) by the combined votes of the NDP and Green members, Lieutenant Governor Judith Guichon turned down Clark's request for a snap election and invited the NDP to form a minority government. Subsequently, Horgan succeeded Clark as the premier of British Columbia. Horgan was the first NDP premier of the province since Ujjal Dosanjh in 2001.

On September 21, 2020, Horgan called a snap election that was held on October 24. On November 8, with the final vote count completed, the NDP won a record 57 seats with the highest share of the popular vote in the party's history and formed a majority government for the first time since the 1996 general election. The election result made Horgan British Columbia's first two-term NDP premier. During his second term, Horgan became the longest serving BC NDP premier in the province's history.

On June 28, 2022, Horgan announced that he would be stepping down as premier and NDP party leader once a new leader had been chosen in a leadership election. Horgan was succeeded by David Eby on November 18, 2022.

Early life and career
Horgan was born on August 7, 1959, in Victoria, British Columbia, Canada, the son of Alice May (Clutterbuck) and Pat Horgan. Horgan's father died when he was 18 months old, leaving his mother to raise him along with his three siblings. He worked multiple jobs to save money for university, including at a pulp mill in Ocean Falls. Horgan met his wife Ellie Horgan in 1979 while studying at Trent University in Peterborough, Ontario. They have two sons together. In 1983, Horgan earned a Bachelor of Arts from Trent. In the 2000s, Horgan was diagnosed with bladder cancer.

He waited tables at the Keg in Victoria before earning his master's degree in history from the University of Sydney in 1986. Returning to Canada he went to Ottawa and worked as a legislative assistant to James Manly and later to Lynn Hunter. Horgan returned to Victoria in 1991 and became ministerial assistant to Dave Zirnhelt. In 1993, he was named analyst in the Policy Coordination Branch of the Ministry of Government Services, and in 1996, director at the Cabinet Policy and Communications Secretariat, Ministry of Finance and Corporate Relations. His positions from 1991 through 1998 saw him assume increasing responsibilities within government, including lead negotiator on the Columbia Basin Trust and as a participant on teams for the Columbia River Treaty and Land Use Plans. In 1998, he worked as a director in the Crown Corporations Secretariat before going on to work at Columbia Power as director of Corporate Affairs, focusing on getting Keenleyside and Brilliant dams repowered. In 1999, he was appointed chief of staff in the office of Premier Dan Miller. His last job in government was at the level of associate deputy minister working in the Ministry of Finance on energy projects. Following the change of government in 2001, Horgan created a small business that focused on policy, management, research and government liaison work. He formed a consulting company called IdeaWorks, along with former deputy minister Nancy Thompson, former NDP caucus research director Mary O'Donoghue, and two former NDP bureaucrats—Ian Reid and John Heaney—with whom he worked in the Ministry of Management Services in the 1990s, overseeing the expansion of gambling across the province. IdeaWorks was credited with developing a sophisticated campaign in 2003 by which they were successful in convincing Vancouver City Council to lift a moratorium on slot machines.

Early years as MLA (2005–2014)

38th Parliament
As the 2005 provincial election was approaching, the 45-year-old Horgan won the NDP nomination against Julie Thomas of Shawnigan Lake in the riding of Malahat-Juan de Fuca. The incumbent MLA Brian Kerr was not seeking re-election, so in the general election Horgan faced BC Liberal Cathy Basskin of Cowichan Bay, Democratic Reform BC party leader Tom Morino, Green Party candidate Steven Hurdle, and Western Canada Concept candidate Pattie O'Brien. Though Horgan won his riding, the NDP under Carole James's leadership formed the Official Opposition to the BC Liberals who formed a majority government.

Horgan was named to the NDP front bench as its education critic. He criticized the government's 2005 Teachers' Collective Agreement Act which legislated teachers into a new contract, after several months of unsuccessful collective bargaining, as "[inflaming] an already volatile situation". In June 2006, Horgan was named energy and mines critic. Horgan called for the BC Oil and Gas Commission to provide more transparent reporting after it was claimed its annual 97 percent compliance rating was near-perfect, despite 2,500 known infractions, the majority of which were rated major or serious. Following a sudden sharp increase in gasoline prices in early 2007, Horgan introduced the Retail Petroleum Consumer Protection Act as a private member bill which, if passed, would have put gasoline prices under the jurisdiction of the BC Utilities Commission, the same as electricity and natural gas. The bill was supported by an 18,000-signature petition and elicited editorial responses from Minister Neufeld and Christy Clark.

In January 2007, Horgan accused Premier Gordon Campbell of conflict-of-interest due to his owning of shares of Alcan while signing an order-in-council approving an agreement between Alcan and BC Hydro which was subsequently overturned by the Utilities Commission as being not in the public interest. The Ethics Commissioner cleared Campbell of wrongdoing but made a recommendation that cabinet ministers and other senior officials place their assets in blind trusts. Horgan subsequently introduced this recommendation as the private member bill Members' Conflict of Interest Amendment Act in the third and fourth sessions and a similar but more comprehensive bill, in line with the Federal Accountability Act, but they were not advanced beyond first reading.

In the fourth quarter of 2008, Horgan was diagnosed with bladder cancer and underwent treatment surgery to remove it. Following a legislative amendment that immediately increased MLA salaries by 29%, Horgan, along with all other NDP MLAs, donated the increase to charities in his riding, such as hospices and food banks, for the remainder of the 38th Parliament.

39th Parliament
Horgan was acclaimed as the NDP candidate for the 2009 election in the Juan de Fuca riding. He defeated Colwood mayor Jody Twa of the BC Liberals and Metchosin farmer James Powell of the Green Party. In the 39th Parliament, the NDP again formed the Official Opposition to the BC Liberals, who formed their third consecutive majority government. Party leader Carole James kept Horgan as Energy and Mines critic. Horgan was critical of the government overturning the BC Utilities Commission's decision on obtaining electricity from independent power producers and exempting the Site C dam and the northwest transmission line projects from Utilities Commission review, arguing that the projects were not in the public interest. Horgan linked the government's imposition of private IPP electricity purchasing agreements on BC Hydro and the exemption of BC Utilities Commission review of major public projects (including the smart meter implementation program) to increases in BC Hydro rates. Horgan responded to the government's energy plan with an editorial to which Minister Blair Lekstrom responded. Horgan presented to the legislature a declaration of opposition to the Site C project, as signed by Peace River area residents and First Nations.

During criticism of party leader Carole James, Horgan remained loyal. Following her resignation, the 51-year-old Horgan put himself forward as a leadership candidate for the NDP. Policy platforms he campaigned on included a comprehensive review of taxation under a Fair Tax Commission, expanding the carbon tax to include the exempted large industrial emitters, getting the Evergreen Line and light rail to the Western Communities built, implementing the recommendations of the Select Standing Committee on Aquaculture, continuing the ban on North Coast tanker traffic and offshore oil exploration, and introducing an Endangered Species Act. He was endorsed by Robin Austin, Gary Coons, Kathy Corrigan, Scott Fraser, Maurine Karagianis, Bill Routley, Shane Simpson, and Claire Trevena, as well as Harry Lali and Nicholas Simons after they dropped out of the race. Opinion polling placed Horgan third behind Adrian Dix and Mike Farnworth, but being seen as a suitable compromise candidate between the party's preferred stronger candidate of Dix and the more likable Farnworth. Dix went on to win and assigned Horgan back to the role of critic for the Ministry of Energy, Mines and Petroleum Resources which Doug Donaldson had overseen during the leadership election, as well as adding house leader to his duties.

Leader of the Opposition (2014–2017)

40th Parliament 
In the 2013 election Horgan again won the Juan de Fuca riding, this time against BC Liberal candidate and Sooke councillor Kerrie Reay and Green Party candidate Carlos Serra. On the local level, his campaign focused on transportation issues and regional growth while on the provincial campaign he promised a comprehensive review of BC Hydro, in particular its debt load, commitments to independent power producers, and future infrastructure requirements, and advocated a market-driven approach to creating a liquefied natural gas industry, in contrast to the BC Liberal approach, at the time, of presenting expressions of interest as committed future revenue. The NDP were favoured to win the general election but, while Horgan won his riding, the party again formed the Official Opposition with Horgan returning to his role as critic for the energy portfolio in the 40th Parliament. Shortly after the election, Horgan and Minister of Energy and Mines Bill Bennett exchanged op-eds regarding new BC Hydro rate increases and cost overruns in the Northwest Transmission line project.

In September 2013, Dix announced his resignation as NDP leader and both Horgan and Farnsworth were immediately considered front-runners to replace him. A month later Horgan stated his intention not to run and encouraged the younger NDP MLAs, such as David Eby, Spencer Chandra Herbert and Rob Fleming, to enter the leadership race. However, by January 2014 only Mike Farnworth announced an intention to run. With Farnworth formally declaring his candidacy in early March 2014, Horgan was urged to re-considered. The 54-year old Horgan announced his candidacy on March 17 backed by Carole James, Maurine Karagianis and Bill Routley. David Eby and Michelle Mungall endorsed him and co-chaired his campaign and within a week 15 MLAs endorsed him. In early April, with Horgan receiving further endorsements from Dawn Black, Joe Trasolini and Fin Donnelly – all figures from Farnworth's Tri-Cities-area, Farnworth withdrew from the leadership race, leaving Horgan the sole candidate. After the deadline for nominations passed on May 1, Horgan was acclaimed leader of the BC NDP and became the leader of the Opposition. He appointed Farnsworth as opposition house leader, with Mungall as his deputy and critic of social development, and split his old position of critic position into three parts divided between Norm Macdonald as critic of energy and mines, Bruce Ralston on natural gas, Dix on BC Hydro, as well as charging the younger MLAs with significant portfolios, like Rob Fleming with education, Spencer Chandra Herbert with environment, and David Eby with eight specific critic responsibilities.

Just prior to becoming leader, the parliament's second session, Horgan introduced two private member bills, the Standing Committee Reform Act, 2014 (Bill M-203) that would have expanded the scope of their terms of reference and required they be appointed at the beginning of each parliament with membership in proportion to party standings, and the Parliamentary Calendar Act, 2014 (Bill M-204) that would have legislated that the parliament must convene in the Spring and Fall of each year. After he became leader, these two bills were re-introduced by NDP critic on democratic reform Gary Holman in the fourth session (2015). As leader, Horgan introduced three bills, all in the fifth session: the Hydro Affordability Act, 2016 (Bill M-206) that would allow the Utilities Commission to require a utility to offer a 'lifeline rate' to low-income households, the Speculator Tracking and Housing Affordability Fund Act, 2016 (Bill M-209) that would have allowed participating jurisdictions that levy a 2% property tax on residential properties held vacant for use in affordable housing initiatives, and Campaign Finance Reform Act, 2016 (Bill M-213) that would ban corporations and unions from making financial political contributions and require the chief electoral officer review and provide recommendations regarding the financing of the political process. In the sixth session, Horgan introduced the Get Big Money Out of Politics Act, 2017 which would ban union and corporate donations to political campaigns, prohibit political contributions from foreigners, and prohibit the premier and ministers from receiving second salaries.

Premier of British Columbia (2017–2022)

41st Parliament 
In the 2017 general election, Horgan sought re-election in the Langford-Juan de Fuca riding. He was challenged by BC Liberal candidate Cathy Noel, BC Green candidate Brendan Ralfs, as well as Scott Burton of the BC Libertarian Party and Willie Nelson of the newly formed Vancouver Island Party. As party leader, Horgan spent much of the campaign travelling the province supporting local candidates. He debated the BC Liberal and BC Green leaders, Christy Clark and Andrew Weaver. While he won his riding and his party was initially ahead in the polls, projected to win 46 seats at the beginning of the campaign, his party only won 41 seats and again formed the Official Opposition to the BC Liberals, who had won 43 seats. However, Horgan and Weaver struck a confidence-and-supply agreement which both parties' caucuses endorsed.

On paper, the NDP–Green agreement allowed the NDP to form government by one seat. Regardless, Clark did not resign, arguing she had a constitutional duty to test Parliament's confidence as the incumbent premier. Clark initiated the first session of the 41st Parliament of British Columbia on June 22. On June 28, Horgan introduced a no-confidence motion as an amendment to the Speech from the Throne. With both the NDP and the BC Greens, who held 3 seats, voting for the amendment, it was passed on a 44–42 vote; this became the first time that a BC government has been defeated in the legislature. Clark then asked  Lieutenant Governor Judith Guichon for a new election. She claimed that the NDP could not provide stable government because it needed to appoint one of its members as Speaker, and that person would have to frequently use their casting vote to break 43–43 ties. However, Guichon did not agree and instead invited Horgan to form a government. The Horgan ministry was duly sworn in on July 18.

With Clark resigning her seat in August and Liberal MLA Darryl Plecas agreeing to take the Speaker's post in September (for which he was subsequently expelled from his party), along with the BC Green votes in confidence motions, Horgan was able to continue in office by one seat.

42nd Parliament 
Elections in British Columbia must be held at least every four years, but the lieutenant governor has the right to dissolve Parliament early–in practice, on the advice of the premier. On September 21, 2020, Horgan asked Lieutenant Governor Janet Austin for an early election. In accordance with provincial constitutional practice, Austin granted the request, setting an election for October 24. It was the first snap election in the province since 1986.

Horgan led the BC NDP to a decisive victory with 57 seats—the most the party had ever won in a provincial election, and the first time since 1996 that the NDP had won government in its own right.

On October 28, 2021, it was announced that Horgan had discovered a growth in his throat that required surgery. As a result, he appointed Mike Farnworth as deputy premier. Horgan underwent "successful" surgery on October 29, 2021. Six days later, Horgan announced that the growth was malignant. He said that he would require radiation treatment, and that he anticipated "a full recovery". He also said he planned to continue on as premier, and that he would take part in meetings virtually, but that Farnworth or other ministers might attend in-person at events on his behalf.

On June 28, 2022, Horgan announced that he would be stepping down as premier and NDP party leader once a new leader had been chosen.

On February 9, 2023, Horgan announced that he would resign as MLA that March and retire from politics.

Electoral results

References

External links

John Horgan NDP Caucus page
John Horgan MLA
Legislative Assembly of British Columbia
John Horgan's Web Page for the 2014 BC NDP Leadership Campaign

Living people
Premiers of British Columbia
British Columbia New Democratic Party MLAs
21st-century Canadian politicians
Leaders of the British Columbia CCF/NDP
Politicians from Victoria, British Columbia
Trent University alumni
University of Sydney alumni
1959 births